WEON-LP, UHF analog channel 60, was a low-powered Fox-affiliated television station serving the United States Virgin Islands that was licensed to Frederiksted, Saint Croix. Owned by Caribbean Broadcasting Network, it was a sister station to WVGN-LD (channel 19), WVXF (channel 17), and WVGN.

WEON-LP had a construction permit for its digital signal on channel 42.

The station's license was canceled by the Federal Communications Commission (FCC) on February 20, 2013, as it had not broadcast since December 31, 2011. Fox programming has since shifted to LKK's WVXF-DT2, where it is carried in high definition.

External links
Caribbean Broadcasting Network

EON-LP
Defunct television stations in the United States
Television channels and stations established in 2005
2005 establishments in the United States Virgin Islands
Television channels and stations disestablished in 2013
2013 disestablishments in the United States Virgin Islands
EON-LP